Line 3 is a planned line of the Rio de Janeiro Metro (Metrô Rio) which would connect Rio de Janeiro and Niterói. This is a challenge due to the fact that the line would need to cross the Guanabara Bay, presumably underwater. Niterói last had rail service of any kind in 2007 and its public transit is currently only served by buses and boats.

Background 
The plan to build a subway line connecting Rio de Janeiro to its sister municipality, Niterói, has existed since at least 1968. In the 1968 plan, it was estimated that the line would've been built by 1990. However, that deadline was never met.

Throughout the following years, many more promises were made – and subsequently not kept – by a multitude of governors of Rio de Janeiro regarding the construction of Line 3:

 In 2006, a seminar called "Rio de Janeiro on Rails – Subway Line 3" was held by the Brazilian Association of the Railway Industry (shortened as ABIFER) to discuss the implementation of the project of Line 3.
 In 2011, the Brazilian Ministry of Works announced that construction on the line would begin that year for a 2014 opening. The line would feature an existing  suburban rail alignment in Niterói, São Gonçalo and Itaboraí being upgraded to metro standard, and a  tunnel under Guanabara Bay to Rio de Janeiro. Federal funds for the construction, totalling R$ 1.2 billion, were initially intended to be granted in 2012, but were barred by Congress in late 2011.
 In September 2013, governor Sérgio Cabral and president Dilma Rousseff announced a partnership between the federal and state governments, with the goal of collecting R$2.57 billion in total to be put towards the construction of Line 3.
 In October 2014, governor Pezão stated his intent in starting the construction of Line 3 before the end of the year. Eight months later, in June 2015, Pezão explained that the state's government didn't have the necessary funds to build it, which had an estimated cost of R$3.9 billion. The Director Plan of Urban Transportation of 2015 estimated that construction of its many projects should be done by 2036, but that it would be ideal for them to be finished by 2021.
 In July 2019, governor Wilson Witzel guaranteed that, during his administration, the construction of Line 3 would begin. Six months later, in January 2020, Witzel stated that the administration was considering whether building more boat stations would be more effective than building Line 3. Later that year, in August 2020, Witzel was suspended from office – and was subsequently impeached in April 2021 –, being replaced by Cláudio Castro as governor of Rio de Janeiro.

References

Rio de Janeiro Metro
Rio de Janeiro - Line 3
Proposed rail infrastructure in Brazil